Brigitte Borghese (1955 – 9 February 2013) was an Israeli-born French actress.  She is best known for her roles in Jean Rollin's Les Trottoirs de Bangkok and Operation Las Vegas.

Early life
Brigitte Borghese was born in 1955 in Israel.  She decided on being an actress from an early age and moved to Paris, France, where she trained at René Simon's Cours Simon Drama School.

Career
Borghese made her acting debut in Menahem Golan's 1969 film Margo Sheli. She has appeared in adult and traditional films. During the seventies she had roles in several films, her first being, a part in the adult feature Je prends la chose... du bon côté!, La bonzesse, Tout le monde il en a deux, her first time working with French director Jean Rollin, the fantasy horror Tendre Dracula, with Peter Cushing and Alida Valli, ...et mourir de désir, Les petites saintes y touchent, Les bijoux de famille, Le commando des chauds lapins, and L'hippopotamours.

She is perhaps best known for her role as gang leader 'Rita' in Jean Rollin's 1984 classic Les Trottoirs de Bangkok, her second time working with the director.  Her final appearance in a Rollin film was in the comedy Ne prends pas les poulets pour des pigeons.

It was during the eighties that Borghese's acting career began to cease.  In the nineties, she had the leading role in the action film Operation Las Vegas, with Richard Harrison.  In 1998, Borghese again played a leading role in the American/French television film Brooklyn Cop.  Following her role in Brooklyn Cop, Borghese was to again work with director N.G. Mount in his next film Britta the Torture, but the project remains unfinished.

Filmography

References

External links
 
 Brigitte Borghese biography

1955 births
2013 deaths
Israeli emigrants to France
French film actresses